Hugo Caballero may refer to:

 Hugo Caballero (footballer, born 1958), Paraguayan football defender
 Hugo Caballero (footballer, born 1974), Honduran football goalkeeper